In geodesy and geophysics, the Bouguer anomaly (named after Pierre Bouguer) is a gravity anomaly, corrected for the height at which it is measured and the attraction of terrain. The height correction alone gives a free-air gravity anomaly.

Definition
The Bouguer anomaly  defined as:

Here, 
  is the free-air gravity anomaly.
  is the Bouguer correction which allows for the gravitational attraction of rocks between the measurement point and sea level;
  is a terrain correction which allows for deviations of the surface from an infinite horizontal plane

The free-air anomaly , in its turn, is related to the observed gravity  as follows:

where:
  is the correction for latitude (because the Earth is not a perfect sphere; see normal gravity);
  is the free-air correction.

Reduction
A Bouguer reduction is called simple (or incomplete) if the terrain is approximated by an infinite flat plate called the Bouguer plate. A refined (or complete) Bouguer reduction removes the effects of terrain more precisely. The difference between the two is called the (residual) terrain effect (or (residual) terrain correction) and is due to the differential gravitational effect of the unevenness of the terrain; it is always negative.

Simple reduction
The gravitational acceleration  outside a Bouguer plate is perpendicular to the plate and towards it, with magnitude 2πG times the mass per unit area, where  is the gravitational constant. It is independent of the distance to the plate (as can be proven most simply with Gauss's law for gravity, but can also be proven directly with Newton's law of gravity). Using  =  we get  times the mass per unit area. For mean rock density this gives .

The Bouguer reduction for a Bouguer plate of thickness  is

On Earth the effect on gravity of elevation is 0.3086 mGal m−1 decrease when going up, minus the gravity of the Bouguer plate, giving the Bouguer gradient of 0.1967 mGal m−1.

More generally, for a mass distribution with the density depending on one Cartesian coordinate z only, gravity for any z is 2πG times the difference in mass per unit area on either side of this z value. A combination of two parallel infinite if equal mass per unit area plates does not produce any gravity between them.

See also

Notes

References

External links 
 Bouguer anomalies of Belgium. The blue regions are related to deficit masses in the subsurface
 Bouguer gravity anomaly grid for the conterminous US by the [United States Geological Survey].
 Bouguer anomaly map of Grahamland F.J. Davey (et al.), British Antarctic Survey, BAS Bulletins 1963-1988
 Bouguer anomaly map depicting south-eastern Uruguay's Merín Lagoon anomaly (amplitude greater than +100 mGal), and detail of site.
 List of Magnetic and Gravity Maps by State by the [United States Geological Survey].

Geophysics
Gravimetry